Piaski is a village in the administrative district of Gmina Konopnica, within Wieluń County, Łódź Voivodeship, in central Poland.

References 

Piaski